Brooklyn House is a heritage-listed residence at 11 William Street, Howard, Fraser Coast Region, Queensland, Australia.

It is associated with Member of the Queensland Legislative Assembly Colin Rankin and his daughter Australian Senator Annabelle Rankin.

References

Fraser Coast Local Heritage Register
Howard, Queensland
Houses in Queensland